"Freedom" is a song by Trinidadian-American rapper and singer Nicki Minaj, for the reissue of her second studio album Pink Friday: Roman Reloaded, subtitled The Re-Up (2012). It was written by Minaj, Matthew Burnett, and Matthew Samuels. Production was helmed by Samuels under his stage name Boi-1da. The song was released for digital download by Cash Money Records in the US and Canada on November 2, 2012 and in other countries on November 6, 2012. It was serviced to US urban radio on November 27 and to mainstream radio in the United Kingdom the following day. "Freedom" is a downtempo hip hop and R&B song that features a "sonically breezy" soundscape, complied with ambient riffs, pop-inspired synths, and soft pop choruses.

To promote the song, an accompanying music video for the song was released on November 15, 2012. It was shot mainly in black and white, and features Minaj in a variety of scenes such as a deserted area with a boat, dressed as a Queen on a throne, and is interspersed with scenes of nature. The song peaked at number 17 on the UK R&B Chart, number 23 on the US Rap Songs, and number 31 on the US Hot R&B/Hip-Hop Songs. "Freedom" was promoted with several live performances, most notably the American Music Awards of 2012.

Background
In September 2012, Minaj announced the reissue of Pink Friday: Roman Reloaded, subtitled The Re-Up, containing an additional disc with eight newly-recording songs and an exclusive behind-the-scenes DVD to supplement the standard edition of the original album. Minaj commented at the 2012 MTV Video Music Awards, "I'm putting lots of new songs on there and I'm actually going to drop my new single like next week. Barbz, you are gonna spaz. You are gonna love it. You are gonna go crazy!" Production of the project was a main focus on Minaj's three-part E! special, Nicki Minaj: My Truth, which aired in November 2012. On On Air with Ryan Seacrest, Minaj stated that "I feel like the music is such a better representation of me where I am now as an artist in my career. As long as people can hear the music, I'm good."<ref name="rap2">{{cite web |url=http://www.rap-up.com/2012/11/19/nicki-minaj-the-re-up-is-a-better-representation-of-me/ |title=Nicki Minaj: The Re-Up' Is a Better Representation of Me' |work=Rap-Up |publisher=Buzz Media |date=November 19, 2012 |access-date=April 7, 2012 }}</ref>

Composition and critical reception
Musically, "Freedom" is a hip hop and R&B song that follows a similar style to other Minaj songs heard on her debut album, Pink Friday. The song features street-slang bravado and "venomous" rapping in the verses with thin, fragile vocals over whipsy soft pop choruses. The instrumentation in "Freedom" mixes together smooth ambient riffs, pop-inspired crystal-clear synthesizers, and a smooth R&B beat, creating a sonically breezy soundscape. Lyrically, Minaj is still confrontational yet reflective, talking about her life in the spotlight and rise to fame. In the lyrics, Minaj states how other rappers "in the competition" will never thank her for opening the doors for them, and how they don't even thank their creator Jesus Christ for helping them get far, saying: "They'll never thank me for opening doors / But they ain't even thank Jesus when he died on the cross / 'Cause your spirit is ungrateful, bitches is so hateful, I remain a staple."

Charley Rogulewski of Vibe said "The old Nicki Minaj is back on her latest track "Freedom."", while going onto note the songs "dreamy" production and compared it to "Right Thru Me," "Your Love" and "Save Me" off her debut album. Entertainment Weekly reviewer Kyle Anderson called the song "middle-of-the-road R&B" and criticized Minaj for choosing to make music that appeals to pop radio, instead of being unique. Josiah Hughes of Exclaim! was critical of the song, saying it was: "by-the-books Nicki, as she delivers venomous raps on the verses before giving saccharine-sweet melody a whirl on the choruses. Surprise, surprise — the whole thing is delivered atop poppy, crystal clear synths."

Music video

Background and synopsis
The video was shot in black-and-white at Dungeness, Kent, United Kingdom. It begins with a stairway set in a foggy setting leading up to the sky. Then angles of different scenery are shown such as a deserted area with a boat next to a Slipway resembling Noah's Ark, Slipway, and a True Cross with a key hung over it. Minaj is shown fading into clouds, before she raps her first verse wearing a black flowing dress and a crown of thorns. Minaj has various wardrobe changes in the video. Minaj is then seen dressed as a queen, over a balcony with a spiral chandelier behind her. Various clips of nature are shown such as waves, birds, and grass. Minaj is then seen singing the chorus in a blonde wig, in a vast space, with a lot of fog. Minaj raps her second verse sitting on a throne donning a black wig similar to the on she wore in her previous music video for "I Am Your Leader". After scenes of nature and of Minaj, the video transforms into color. The video concludes as Minaj is seen with a stray-like face, walking in the wilderness, while clips of Minaj singing continue throughout the video. It closes with the stairway, seen in the beginning of the video.

Reception
Tom Eames of Digital Spy complimented the video for its "glamorous" shots of Minaj, a sentiment echoed by Liza Darwin of MTV News, who said: "We already know Nicki's got her beauty and fashion game on lock these days, but for her new vid the singer ditches the bustiers, tutus, and Zenon-inspired ensembles for a toned-down (for her, at least) wardrobe of glittery gowns, decadent furs, and more than one crown. After all, if there's ANYONE fit to be queen bee, it's this lady."

Live performances
Minaj performed the song live for the first time on the American Music Awards of 2012 on November 18, 2012. For the performance, Minaj wore a white fur cape and boots, and was later joined on-stage by a choir. "Freedom" was also performed on The Ellen DeGeneres Show on January 15, 2013, where she sang in a slim red dress, surrounded by fog and gina chandeliers. On January 25, 2013, Minaj performed the song along with "Va Va Voom" and on Jimmy Kimmel Live!'' on January 25, 2013.

Charts

Radio and release history

References

2012 singles
Music videos directed by Colin Tilley
Nicki Minaj songs
Republic Records singles
Song recordings produced by Boi-1da
Songs written by Nicki Minaj
Black-and-white music videos
Songs written by Matthew Burnett
2012 songs
Contemporary R&B ballads